Nely Edith Miranda Herrera (born 2 August 1972) is a Mexican paralympic swimmer and a politician from the Institutional Revolutionary Party. She served as a member of the Chamber of Deputies from 2009 to 2012.

She competed at the 2008 and 2016 Paralympics and won two gold and one bronze medals. The bronze medal was won in the 50 meters freestyle S4, which she entered as World Record holder from two months earlier but failed to win gold.

Notes

References

External links 

 
 Nely Miranda Herrera – Glasgow 2015 IPC Swimming World Championships at the International Paralympic Committee

1972 births
Living people
Mexican female freestyle swimmers
Paralympic swimmers of Mexico
Paralympic gold medalists for Mexico
Paralympic bronze medalists for Mexico
Swimmers at the 2008 Summer Paralympics
Swimmers at the 2016 Summer Paralympics
Medalists at the 2008 Summer Paralympics
Medalists at the 2016 Summer Paralympics
Medalists at the World Para Swimming Championships
Members of the Chamber of Deputies (Mexico)
Institutional Revolutionary Party politicians
S4-classified Paralympic swimmers
21st-century Mexican politicians
21st-century Mexican women politicians
Sportspeople from Puebla
Politicians from Puebla
People from Puebla (city)
Women members of the Chamber of Deputies (Mexico)
Paralympic medalists in swimming
Medalists at the 2007 Parapan American Games
Medalists at the 2011 Parapan American Games
Medalists at the 2015 Parapan American Games
Medalists at the 2020 Summer Paralympics
Swimmers at the 2020 Summer Paralympics
Mexican female breaststroke swimmers
Deputies of the LXI Legislature of Mexico